Edmund Etsè Hottor (born 6 May 1993) is a Ghanaian footballer who currently plays for  side St Ives Town, where he plays as a midfielder.

Club career

Triestina 
Hottor signed for Triestina in July 2008. The then 15-year-old midfielder spent his first season in Italy playing for the youth team of his club. The following season, he made his professional debut in a Serie B game against Gallipoli, on 17 October 2009. He then went on to make two more appearances with the senior squad.

Milan 
On 3 November 2009, Milan reached an agreement with Triestina, under which Hottor would be transferred to Milan in a co-ownership deal the following January. The move was officially finalised on 11 January 2010, for €800,000. At the end of the season, the co-ownership was renewed for one more year, while at the beginning of the 2011–12 season Hottor's playing rights were fully purchased by Milan, for an additional €100,000. After six years at the club he left for A.C.'s city rivals Inter. He never played a game for A.C. Milan

Virtus Lanciano (loan) 
At the beginning of the 2012–13 season, Hottor was sent out on loan to newly promoted Serie B club Virtus Lanciano.

Nocerina (loan) 
For the 2013–14 campaign, Hottor was sent on a further loan spell to Prima Divisione side Nocerina. However the club was expelled from the league due to sports fraud in the derby against Salernitana. In that match Nocerina had 3 players "injured" followed by Remedi, Hottor, Danti, Kostadinović and Franco Lepore. The first 3 "injured" players were acquitted but the latter 5 were suspended from football for 1 year. Hottor's ban was later reduced.

Venezia (loan) 
On 16 July 2014 Hottor joined Lega Pro club Venezia on loan.

Internazionale
On 31 January 2016 Hottor signed for Internazionale on a free transfer.

Atlético CP (loan) 
On 1 February 2016 Portuguese Segunda Liga club Atlético CP signed Hottor on loan until 30 June 2016.

Olbia and Fafe
He was trained with Lega Pro side Olbia in summer 2016. He played 3 friendlies for the club. However, the club did not sign him. He returned to Portugal again for AD Fafe on 30 August on a reported loan.

St Ives Town
Hotter signed for Southern League Premier Central side St Ives Town on 9 December 2019.

Statistics 
As of 1 September 2013.

1European competitions include UEFA Champions League.
2Other tournaments include Supercoppa Italiana and Coppa Italia Lega Pro.

References

External links 
Profile at Assocalciatori.it 

1993 births
Living people
Footballers from Accra
Association football midfielders
Ghanaian footballers
Ghanaian expatriate footballers
Serie B players
U.S. Triestina Calcio 1918 players
A.C. Milan players
S.S. Virtus Lanciano 1924 players
A.S.G. Nocerina players
Venezia F.C. players
Sliema Wanderers F.C. players
Kettering Town F.C. players
Banbury United F.C. players
St Ives Town F.C. players
Expatriate footballers in Italy
Ghanaian expatriate sportspeople in Italy